Temur Tengizovich Dzhikiya (born 8 May 1998) is a Russian football player. He plays for Armenian club Urartu on loan from Volga Ulyanovsk.

Club career
He made his debut in the Russian Professional Football League for FC Domodedovo Moscow on 9 April 2017 in a game against FC Spartak Kostroma.

He made his Russian Football National League debut for FC Khimki on 24 November 2018 in a game against FC Spartak-2 Moscow.

References

External links
 Profile by Russian Professional Football League
 

1998 births
Footballers from Moscow
Russian people of Georgian descent
Living people
Russian footballers
Association football midfielders
FC Khimki players
FC Ararat Moscow players
FC Volga Ulyanovsk players
FC Veles Moscow players
FC Urartu players
Russian First League players
Russian Second League players
Russian expatriate footballers
Expatriate footballers in Armenia
Russian expatriate sportspeople in Armenia